Pavanje  is a village in Dakshina Kannada district of  Karnataka state, India. It is sited on the north bank of the Nandini River, adjoining National Highway 66 between Udupi and Mangaluru. It lies just outside of Mangalore city and close to Mukka from where the Mangaluru city northern limits start. Pavanje bridge is the entrance to Mangalore city from north. Pavanje lies to south of Haleangadi. The Arabian sea is on west of this village. The village has lush green paddy fields and coconut plantations.

The significance of this place is that it houses the entire family of Lord Shiva. The main temple is Mahalingeshwara temple of Lord Shiva, This temple also has a Ganapathi temple within its premises. The Mahalingeshwara temple is on top of a small hill. On the bottom of the hill there is a temple of Mahadevi and also  Shri Jnanashakthi Subrahmanyaswami Temple which is very popular in this region.

External links 

Yaga at Pavanje
Shri Jnanashakthi Subrahmanyaswamy Temple
http://www.daijiworld.com/news/newsDisplay.aspx?newsID=41216

Villages in Dakshina Kannada district